The 2013–2014 Cyclo-cross Superprestige events and season-long competition took place between 27 October 2013 and 15 February 2014. Sven Nys won his 13th Superprestige, overtaking Niels Albert in the final race of the season.

Results

Season standings
In each race, the top 15 riders gain points, going from 15 points for the winner decreasing by one point per position to 1 point for the rider finishing in 15th position. In case of ties in the total score of two or more riders, the following tie breakers exist: most races started, most races won, best result in the last race.

References

External links

S
S
Cyclo-cross Superprestige